The 2020 Washington Justice season was the second season of Washington Justice's existence in the Overwatch League. The Justice planned to host a league-high five homestand weekends in the 2020 season; the first three would take place at The Anthem, while the second two would be at the Entertainment and Sports Arena. While the first two homestands at took place, all other homestand events were canceled due to the COVID-19 pandemic.

On June 5, the Justice parted ways with head coach Seetoh "JohnGalt" Jian Qing. On June 17, Washington promoted assistant coach Han "Sup7eme" Seung-jun to head coach. After finishing the regular season with a 4–17 record, the Justice swept both the Vancouver Titans and Dallas Fuel in the North America play-in tournament to qualify to the season playoffs. In their first match in the North America bracket, Washington squandered an early 2–0 lead over the San Francisco Shock and lost by a score of 2–3, sending them to the lower bracket. The following day, on September 6, the Justice swept the third-seeded Paris Eternal, 3–0. Washington continued their playoff run, taking down the fourth-seeded Florida Mayhem on September 11 and needing one more win to qualify for the Grand Finals Bracket. However, the team fell to the top-seeded Philadelphia Fusion the following day by a score of 0–3, ending their playoff run.

Preceding offseason

Organizational changes 
In late September 2019, the Justice parted ways with their entire coaching staff from their inaugural season, including head coach Kim "WizardHyeong" Hyeong-seok. The team signed Seetoh "JohnGalt" Jian Qing, who was an assistant coach for the Los Angeles Gladiators, as their new head coach in October. Washington added two more coaches to their staff on November 8, with the hiring of former Hangzhou Spark assistant coach Han "Sup7eme" Seung-jun as a development coach and former XL2 Academy coach Lee "Wiz" Hae-joon as a strategic coach. A month later, on December 5, the Justice signed former Houston Outlaws support player Chris "Bani" Banell as an assistant coach.

Roster changes 

The Justice enter the new season with six free agents, two players which they have the option to retain for another year, and three players under contract. The OWL's deadline to exercise a team option is November 11, after which any players not retained will become a free agent. Free agency officially began on October 7.

Acquisitions 
The Justice's first offseason acquisition was on October 18, when they agreed to acquire main tank Gye "rOar" Chang-hoon from the Los Angeles Gladiators, pending approval from the league. The team made their first signing on October 23 in flex DPS Lee "TTuba" Ho-sung. On November 7, Washington signed former Boston Uprising flex support Kwon "AimGod" Min-seok.

Departures 
On October 7, the Justice announced that they would not re-sign free agents main tank Song "Janus" Joon-hwa, off-tank Kim "SanSam" Hyang-gi, DPS Chon "Ado" Gi-Hyeon, and support Jo "Hyeonu" Hyeon-woo. Days later, they announced that they would not re-sign support Nikola "Sleepy" Andrews, and they would not exercise their option to retain flex support Mun "Gido" Gi-do.

Roster

Transactions 
Transactions of/for players on the roster during the 2020 regular season:
On May 8, DPS Corey "Corey" Nigra and DPS Ethan "Stratus" Yankel retired.
On May 16, the Justice signed DPS Lee "Stitch" Choong-hui and tank Choi "JJANU" Hyeon-woo on 14-day contracts.
On May 22, the Justice signed tank Choi "JJANU" Hyeon-woo to a long-term contract.
On June 1, the Justice signed DPS Lee "Stitch" Choong-hui to a long-term contract.
On June 4, the Justice released tank Elliot "ELLIVOTE" Vaneryd.
On August 12, the Justice signed DPS Jang "Decay" Gui-un.
On September 1, the Justice released tank Lukas "LullSiSH" Wiklund.

Standings

Game log

Regular season

Midseason tournaments 

| style="text-align:center;" | Bonus wins awarded: 0

Postseason

References 

Washington Justice
Washington Justice
Washington Justice seasons